Iván García Sánchez (born February 29, 1972 in Santiago de Cuba) is a former sprinter from Cuba.

Career

He won an Olympic bronze medal in 4 x 100 metres relay in Sydney 2000. He specialized in the 200 metres event and won a silver medal at the 1997 IAAF World Indoor Championships. He finished fourth at the 1993 IAAF World Indoor Championships.

Personal bests
100 metres - 10.21 (1994)
200 metres - 20.17 (1995)

Achievements

External

1972 births
Cuban male sprinters
Living people
Athletes (track and field) at the 1995 Pan American Games
Athletes (track and field) at the 1999 Pan American Games
Athletes (track and field) at the 1996 Summer Olympics
Athletes (track and field) at the 2000 Summer Olympics
Olympic athletes of Cuba
Olympic bronze medalists for Cuba
Sportspeople from Santiago de Cuba
Olympic bronze medalists in athletics (track and field)
Pan American Games medalists in athletics (track and field)
Pan American Games gold medalists for Cuba
Universiade medalists in athletics (track and field)
Goodwill Games medalists in athletics
Central American and Caribbean Games gold medalists for Cuba
Competitors at the 1993 Central American and Caribbean Games
Competitors at the 1998 Central American and Caribbean Games
Universiade bronze medalists for Cuba
World Athletics Indoor Championships medalists
Medalists at the 2000 Summer Olympics
Central American and Caribbean Games medalists in athletics
Medalists at the 1993 Summer Universiade
Medalists at the 1997 Summer Universiade
Competitors at the 1994 Goodwill Games
Medalists at the 1995 Pan American Games